Jerzy Lipiński (1 February 1908 – 13 September 2000) was a Polish racing cyclist. He won the 1933 edition of the Tour de Pologne.

References

External links

1908 births
2000 deaths
Polish male cyclists
Cyclists from Warsaw